Engaeyum Eppothum is a 2011 Indian Tamil-language romantic comedy drama road film written and directed by M. Saravanan in his Tamil debut, he had earlier directed the Telugu film Ganesh (2009). Starring Jai, Sharwanand, Anjali and Ananya, it was produced by A. R. Murugadoss in association with Fox Star Studios, marking the studio's entry into Tamil cinema.

The film illustrates two love stories—one set against the backdrop of Chennai and the other in Tiruchi—which join in the climax. The film released on 16 September 2011, to very positive reviews, going on to become a critical and commercial success. The film was dubbed into Telugu as Journey and released on 16 December 2011. The film was later remade into Kannada as Endendu Ninagagi and in Bengali as Bojhena Shey Bojhena.

Plot
The film focuses on two love stories in Chennai and Tiruchirappalli; one takes place in the period of a day, while the other ensues for months.

The film starts with an accident. Then it flashes back several months before when Amudha, a native village girl from Trichy, arrives in Chennai for a job interview, but her sister is unable to meet her to direct her to her destination. Amudha enlists the aid of a stranger named Gautham, who agrees to take her as far as the bus stop. However, he ends up travelling with her the entire day, waiting for her during her interview, and dropping her off at her sister's home in the evening. In the course of the day, she comes to understand him and becomes fond of him. While remaining calm and reserved, Gautham reciprocates her feelings. The following day, Amudha returns to Tiruchi, where she realizes that she has fallen in love with Gautham and rejects marriage proposals that come her way. She decides to return to Chennai to meet him. Meanwhile, Gautham realizes that he has fallen in love with Amudha and decides to go to Tiruchi to find her, despite not knowing her address and other any details except her name.

A parallel story follows. Kathiresan, a metal shop worker, harbors feelings towards his neighbor Manimegalai, a nurse. Being shy and soft-spoken, he does not talk to her but continues to watch her every morning for six months. Manimegalai is bold and forthcoming; she agrees to his love and orders him around mercilessly. She puts him through several tests: having him meet her father (a policeman), her former one-side lover on his own, makes him undergo an HIV test, and gets him to agree to organ donation. She wants him to decide on the basis of all that she has put him through as to whether he wants to marry her and spend the rest of his life with her; Kathiresan responds affirmatively. The two grow to love each other unconditionally with their families' consent.

Kathiresan decides to take Manimegalai to visit his family in Arasur, a village near Villupuram, and the two board a bus to take them there. Meanwhile, Gautham boards a bus to return from Tiruchi – the same one that Kathiresan and Manimegalai are travelling in. Simultaneously, Amudha boards a bus to return from Chennai. A few glimpses of other passengers are also seen: a mother and her child, a girls' athletic team, a newly married couple, two college students who are attracted to each other, and a man returning from Dubai to see his five-year-old daughter for the first time.

At a distance from Viluppuram on the Chennai-Tiruchi National Highway 79 (GST road), The SETC bus is redirected into the opposite lane, as one of the lanes is under construction. However, before a contract carriage (omni) bus named Sky travels is redirected, a tarp from a truck blows off and blocks the windshield. Unable to see where he is going, the terrified driver accidentally swerves into the path of the SETC bus. Both the buses collide head-on, killing about 35 people on the spot. Many others die en route to or at the hospital. Gautham sees a severely injured Amudha on the other bus, and she is rushed to a hospital .she reaches the hospital along with Gautham, Kathiresan has succumbed to head trauma. At the hospital, Gautham confesses his love to Amudha at her bedside, and she manages to regain consciousness. Kathiresan's body is taken away by a hysteric Manimegalai and his grieving parents.

The site of the crash is declared an accident prone-area, and the film ends with a message on road safety.

Cast

 Jai as Kathiresan
 Sharvanand as Gautham (credited as Sarva)
 Anjali as Manimegalai
 Ananya as Amudha
 Vatsan Chakravarthy as Ramesh
 Vinodhini Vaidyanathan as Selvi (Amudha's sister)
 Ravi as Gautham's father
 Mithun as a bus passenger (a married man)
 Priya Prince as a bus passenger (a young girl's mother)
 Thangadurai Kanagaraj

Production
The film was initially launched in late 2010 with Vimal and Amala Paul playing a pair in the film. However they pulled out due to prior commitments and were replaced by Sharvanand and Ananya. Thaman was also replaced as music composer by debutant C Sathya.

Soundtrack

The film's score and soundtrack were composed by debutant C Sathya. The album consists of five tracks, featuring lyrics penned by Na Muthukumar and M Saravanan. It was released on 3 August 2011 in Chennai released by actors Suriya, Vivek and Music Director Harris Jayaraj.

Release

Critical reception
Engaeyum Eppothum opened to very positive reviews. GetCinemas.com gave it 3.5/5 rating with a tag "must watch", saying "it is a rare film, and has come out as perfect as a dream" and appreciating for a clearly sketched script and perfect characterisation. Pavithra Srinivasan of Rediff gave the film 3 out of 5, calling it a "genuinely story, not just about romance, but about the fabric of life itself". A critic from Sify wrote that Engeyum Eppodhum  was "riveting cinema with a difference. Everything is new about it from characters to the plot, accompanied by superb performances by the lead actors notably Anjali". The Hindu reviewer Karthik Subramanian noted that it was a "laudable effort" adding that "despite some clichés, the film works well". Behindwoods gave 3 out of 5 and cited that it was a "loveable tale of commoners and their destiny" that had "simplicity as its biggest strength", while Indiaglitz described it as "engaging entertainment" and "a whiff of fresh air in Tamil cinema". G Sai Shyam, another critic from The Hindu, wrote that it was "a novel attempt by the director" and that "the compelling screenplay with a strong message to everyone makes it a must watch film". Vikatan gave 50 out of 100 marks, ranking it among the best in recent times. Venkateswaran Narayanan from The Times of India gave 3 out of 5 and wrote that it was "the perfect example of a film relying solely on its screenplay and performances to strike it rich at the box office". Rohit Ramachandran of nowrunning.com rated it 4/5 stating that "Engeyum Eppodhum reminds us of the fragility of our own lives", going on to call it "one of the year's best". It later appeared on his 'Best of 2011' list

On the contrary, Gautaman Bhaskaran of Hindustan Times gave it 2.5 and praised the lead performances, while criticising the screenplay and the plot.

Remakes
Following the film's success, the film was remade in Bengali as Bojhena Shey Bojhena, starring Soham Chakraborty, Mimi Chakraborty, Payel Sarkar, and Abir Chatterjee, directed by Raj Chakraborty. Sources reported that Bollywood actor Aamir Khan may remake it in Hindi. Producer K Manju acquired the Kannada remake rights of the film and it was remade in Kannada as Endendu Ninagagi.

Awards
M Saravanan was honoured with an award by the Human Rights Organisation on 18 December at Paramakudi for directing Engeyum Eppodhum with a very relevant social message which is the need of the hour. He also secured 50% of votes and was declared as the Best Director of 2011 in the year-end public poll conducted by Oneindia.in for directing Engeyum Eppodhum. Anjali secured 35.2% of votes and was declared as the Best Actress of 2011 for her performance in the film. Anjali was honoured with the Best Actress Award at V4 Entertainment Awards 2011. Ananya was declared as the Best Supporting Actress.

1st South Indian International Movie Awards
Best Lyricist — Na Muthukumar for "Un Pera Theriyathe"
Best Debutant Director — M Saravanan
Best Debutant Male — Sharvanand

59th Filmfare Awards South
Best Actress - Anjali
Best Supporting Actress - Ananya

6th Vijay Awards
 Best Film
 Best Actress - Anjali
Nominated-Best Director - M Saravanan
Nominated-Best Supporting Actress - Ananya
Nominated-Best Music Director - C Sathya

Edison Awards
 Edison Award for Best Debut Director – M Saravanan
 Edison Award for Best Female Playback Singer - Chinmayi for "Chotta Chotta"

Engeyum Eppodhum appeared on the following top five lists of the best films of 2011.
 2nd place — Rediff
 3rd place — The Hindu
 5th place — The Asian Age

Legacy 

The character Kathiresan portrayed by Jai Sampath makes a cameo appearance in 2015 film Masss.

References

External links
 

2011 films
Films shot in Tiruchirappalli
Films shot in Tamil Nadu
Tamil films remade in other languages
2010s Tamil-language films
Films set in Chennai
Films scored by C. Sathya
2010s drama road movies
Indian drama road movies
Indian nonlinear narrative films
Hyperlink films
Films set in Tiruchirappalli
Fox Star Studios films
2011 drama films